Oldest Living Confederate Widow Tells All is a 1994 American television miniseries written by Joyce Eliason and based on the 1989 novel by Allan Gurganus. It was directed by Ken Cameron and starred Diane Lane, Donald Sutherland, Cicely Tyson and Anne Bancroft.

The miniseries won several Emmy Awards, including an Outstanding Supporting Actress award to Cicely Tyson. This miniseries was first aired in two parts on CBS on May 1 and 3, 1994.

Plot
On her 99th birthday, Lucy Honicut Marsden (Anne Bancroft) recalls her life as the 14-year-old bride of a veteran of the American Civil War.

Cast
Diane Lane as young Lucy Honicut Marsden
Donald Sutherland as Capt. William Marsden
Cicely Tyson as Castalia, Marsden Family House Slave/Maid
Anne Bancroft as Lucy Marsden (age 99)
Blythe Danner as Bianca Honicut
E. G. Marshall as Prof. Taw, Old Folks Home Resident

References

External links

1990s American television miniseries
1994 drama films
American Civil War films
Films scored by Mark Snow
Films about old age
CBS network films
Television shows based on American novels
Films directed by Ken Cameron
Primetime Emmy Award-winning television series
1990s English-language films
1990s American films